Balanagar is a neighbourhood of Hyderabad. It is located in Medchal-Malkajgiri district of the Indian state of Telangana. It is under the administration of Balanagar mandal of Malkajgiri revenue division. It was a part of Ranga Reddy district before the re-organisation of districts in the state. It is administered as Ward No. 120 of the Greater Hyderabad Municipal Corporation.

References 

Medchal–Malkajgiri district
Municipal wards of Hyderabad, India